is a former member of the female Japanese idol group Sakurazaka46. She also serves as a regular model for the female fashion magazine LARME since July 2017 and an exclusive model for the female fashion magazine  since November 2017. Like other members, Watanabe is represented by Sony Music Labels.

Biography
Born on 16 May 1995 in Ibaraki Prefecture, Watanabe passed first generation member audition of Keyakizaka46 on August 21, 2015 and started her activities.

On 6 May 2017, she made her runway debut at the fashion and music event GirlsAward 2017 SPRING ／ SUMMER, held at the Yoyogi National Gymnasium. She is also part of the subgroup  along with Risa Watanabe, Akane Moriya, Yūka Sugai and Manaka Shida. As part of the subunit, Watanabe made appearances in three songs: "Aozora Chigau" in "Sekai ni wa Ai Shika Nai", "Wareta Sumaho" in "Fukyōwaon, and "Namiuchigiwa o Hashiranai ka?" in "Kaze ni Fukarete mo". 

On 10 July 2017, LARME announced that she will be one of the magazine's regular model. 

On 16 November 2017,  announced that she will be one of the magazine's exclusive model.

Personal life

She is close with Risa Watanabe, who from also from Ibaraki and shares the same family name. Fans call them collectively as "W Watanabe" or "Beri Beri". and is also close with Nagasawa Nanako and Neru Nagahama, and are well-know among fans as Hotoke-zu.

She is shy and clumsy, and her treasure Whale Shark Plush "AOKO" of Okinawa Churaumi Aquarium is popular among the fans.

Skills
Her special skills are playing the piano and Japanese calligraphy (shodō).

Preferences 
Her favorite food are bread, chocolate, meat, and potato. She does not like fish and tomato.

Her favorite movies are Tangled and other Disney movies.

Hobbies 
Her hobbies are visiting neko cafes, shopping, sleeping, and looking up a place with good food and eating there. She has decided to eat curry on Thursdays.

She prefers dogs over cats.

Discography

Singles
 Keyakizaka46

Sakamichi AKB

Videos

Filmography

Events

Bibliography

Magazine Serializations

Photobook Release 
On October 11, 2017, it was announced that Rika Watanabe will release her first photo collection. She became the first member in Keyakizaka46 to have a photobook.

References

External links
 – Keyakizaka46 Official Site 
 – Keyakizaka46 Official Site 

1995 births
Living people
Japanese idols
Japanese female models
Keyakizaka46 members
Musicians from Ibaraki Prefecture
Sakurazaka46 members